Tabletop fusion, nuclear fusion on the tabletop, can be achieved with:

 Bubble fusion (sonofusion), an application of the rapid collapse of bubbles induced by sound waves
 Pyroelectric fusion, an application of intense electric fields within a crystal
 Inertial electrostatic confinement fusion, an application of intense electric fields
 Fusor, an inertial electrostatic confinement based fusion reactor design, some of which are sized to fit on tables